is a Japanese professional golfer.

Arai played on the Japan Golf Tour, winning six times. He also played on the PGA Tour in the 1980s; 45 events from 1983 to 1989, including 16 events in 1986. His best finish was a tie for second at the 1985 Bing Crosby National Pro-Am. He played on the Champions Tour in 2000, with one top-10 finish at The Instinet Classic.

Professional wins (19)

Japan Golf Tour wins (6)

Japan Golf Tour playoff record (1–4)

Other wins (12)
1972 Tokai Classic
1976 Nagano Open
1978 Asahi Toy Ohashi Kyosen Invitational, Gunma Open
1980 Hakuryuko Open, Gunma Open
1982 Saitama Open
1984 Meikyukai Golden Star Charity Tournament, Gunma Open
1985 Meikyukai Golden Star Charity Tournament
1986 Asahi Breweries Ohashi Kyosen Tournament
1993 Sekisui Harmonate Meikyukai Charity Tournament

Senior wins (1)
1993 Maruman Senior Tournament

Results in major championships

Note: Arai only played in the Open Championship.
CUT = missed the half-way cut (3rd round cut in 1985 Open Championship)
"T" = tied

Results in The Players Championship

CUT = missed the half-way cut

Team appearances
World Cup (representing Japan): 1983
Dunhill Cup (representing Japan): 1985
Nissan Cup (representing Japan): 1985

External links

Kikuo Arai at the PGA of Japan official website (in Japanese)

Japanese male golfers
Japan Golf Tour golfers
PGA Tour golfers
PGA Tour Champions golfers
Sportspeople from Saitama Prefecture
1943 births
Living people